The 2015 Masters Tournament was the 79th Masters Tournament, and the first of golf's four major championships, held April 9–12 at Augusta National Golf Club in Augusta, Georgia. Jordan Spieth led wire-to-wire and shot a record-tying 270 (−18) to win his first major at the age of 21, four strokes ahead of runners-up Phil Mickelson and Justin Rose, both major champions.

This was the final Masters appearance for two-time champion Ben Crenshaw.

Course

Field
The Masters has the smallest field of the four major championships. Officially, the Masters remains an invitation event, but there is a set of qualifying criteria that determines who is included in the field. Each player is classified according to the first category by which he qualified, with other categories in which he qualified shown in parentheses. Golfers who qualify based solely on their performance in amateur tournaments (categories 6–11) must remain amateurs on the starting day of the tournament to be eligible to play.

Robert Streb was the only professional in the field who was appearing in his first major.  Twelve other professionals were appearing in their first Masters: Erik Compton, James Hahn, Brian Harman, Morgan Hoffmann, Brooks Koepka, Anirban Lahiri, Shane Lowry, Noh Seung-yul, Brendon Todd, Cameron Tringale, Bernd Wiesberger and Danny Willett. Mikko Ilonen and Ben Martin were appearing in their first Masters as professionals. Each of the amateurs was appearing in his first major, apart from Bradley Neil who had played in the 2014 Open Championship.

Craig Stadler was absent for the first time since 1978.  The 1982 champion, he had appeared in 38 Masters, including 36 consecutively.

Two-time champion Ben Crenshaw played in his 44th and final Masters.

1. Past Masters champions
Ángel Cabrera (16), Fred Couples, Ben Crenshaw, Trevor Immelman, Zach Johnson (17,18,19), Bernhard Langer (12), Sandy Lyle, Phil Mickelson (3,15,18,19), Larry Mize, José María Olazábal, Mark O'Meara, Charl Schwartzel (18,19), Adam Scott (16,17,18,19), Vijay Singh, Bubba Watson (12,16,17,18,19), Tom Watson, Mike Weir, Tiger Woods (5,18), Ian Woosnam
The following past champions did not play: Tommy Aaron, Jack Burke Jr., Charles Coody, Nick Faldo, Raymond Floyd, Doug Ford, Bob Goalby, Jack Nicklaus, Arnold Palmer, Gary Player, Craig Stadler, Fuzzy Zoeller.  Nicklaus, Palmer, and Player served as "honorary starters" and teed off on the first day at the first hole to kick off the tournament.

2. Last five U.S. Open champions
Martin Kaymer (4,5,13,16,17,18,19), Graeme McDowell (18,19), Rory McIlroy (3,4,12,14,15,16,17,18,19), Justin Rose (16,17,18,19), Webb Simpson (17,18,19)

3. Last five Open Championship champions
Darren Clarke, Ernie Els, Louis Oosthuizen (18,19)

4. Last five PGA Championship champions
Keegan Bradley (13,18,19), Jason Dufner (18)

5. Last three winners of The Players Championship
Matt Kuchar (12,16,17,18,19)

6. Top two finishers in the 2014 U.S. Amateur
Corey Conners (a), Gunn Yang (a)

7. Winner of the 2014 Amateur Championship
Bradley Neil (a)

8. Winner of the 2014 Asia-Pacific Amateur Championship
Antonio Murdaca (a)

9. Winner of the 2015 Latin America Amateur Championship
Matías Domínguez (a)

10. Winner of the 2014 U.S. Amateur Public Links
Byron Meth (a)

11. Winner of the 2014 U.S. Mid-Amateur
Scott Harvey (a)

12. The top 12 finishers and ties in the 2014 Masters Tournament
Thomas Bjørn (18), Jonas Blixt, Rickie Fowler (13,14,15,17,18,19), Miguel Ángel Jiménez (18), John Senden (17,18), Jordan Spieth (16,17,18,19), Kevin Stadler, Jimmy Walker (16,17,18,19), Lee Westwood (18,19)

13. Top 4 finishers and ties in the 2014 U.S. Open
Erik Compton, Jason Day (16,17,18,19), Dustin Johnson (16,17,18,19), Brooks Koepka (16,18,19), Henrik Stenson (15,18,19)

14. Top 4 finishers and ties in the 2014 Open Championship
Jim Furyk (17,18,19), Sergio García (17,18,19)

15. Top 4 finishers and ties in the 2014 PGA Championship

16. Winners of PGA Tour events that award a full-point allocation for the FedEx Cup, between the 2014 Masters Tournament and the 2015 Masters Tournament
Bae Sang-moon, Ben Crane, Matt Every (19), Bill Haas (17,18,19), James Hahn, Brian Harman, Pádraig Harrington, Charley Hoffman, J. B. Holmes (19), Billy Horschel (17,18,19), Chris Kirk (17,18,19), Hunter Mahan (17,18,19), Ben Martin, Hideki Matsuyama (17,18,19),  Ryan Moore (18,19), Noh Seung-yul, Patrick Reed (17,18,19), Brandt Snedeker (19), Robert Streb, Kevin Streelman, Brendon Todd (17,19), Camilo Villegas

Tim Clark did not play due to elbow injury.

17. All players qualifying for the 2014 edition of The Tour Championship
Russell Henley, Morgan Hoffmann, Kevin Na (18,19), Geoff Ogilvy, Ryan Palmer (18,19), Cameron Tringale, Gary Woodland (18,19)

18. Top 50 on the final 2014 Official World Golf Ranking list
Luke Donald (19), Jamie Donaldson (19), Victor Dubuisson (19), Stephen Gallacher (19), Mikko Ilonen, Thongchai Jaidee (19), Shane Lowry (19), Joost Luiten (19), Ian Poulter (19), Steve Stricker, Danny Willett (19)

Marc Leishman withdrew for personal reasons.

19. Top 50 on the Official World Golf Ranking list on March 30, 2015
Paul Casey, Branden Grace, Anirban Lahiri, Bernd Wiesberger

20. International invitees
None

Par 3 contest
Wednesday, April 8, 2015
Kevin Streelman won the par 3 contest on Wednesday in a playoff over Camilo Villegas, after both finished at 5-under par. Five holes-in-one were recorded, tying the record for most in one day first set in 2002. Villegas made two, while Jack Nicklaus hit his first ever hole-in-one at Augusta National. The others were recorded by Trevor Immelman and Matías Domínguez. Opting out in the previous ten years, Tiger Woods played in his first par 3 contest at the Masters since 2004.

Round summaries

First round
Thursday, April 9, 2015

Jordan Spieth recorded nine birdies on his way to a round of 64 (−8), one off the course record, and a three-shot lead. Spieth is the fourth player to open the Masters with a round of 64 or better, and the first since Greg Norman shot 63 in 1996. Rory McIlroy, looking for his third consecutive win in a major and the career grand slam, opened with a round of 71 (−1), as did defending champion Bubba Watson. Four-time champion Tiger Woods, playing in his first tournament since February, shot 73 (+1).

Second round
Friday, April 10, 2015

Jordan Spieth increased his lead to 5 shots after 36 holes with a bogey-free round of 66 (−6). His total of 130 established a new tournament record and tied the major championship record, while his 5-shot lead matched the Masters record for largest lead after two rounds. Dustin Johnson became the first player in Masters history to record three eagles in a round and moved into a tie for third place.
	

Amateurs: Conners (+5), Meth (+6), Murdaca (+7), Domínguez (+8), Harvey (+13), Neil (+13), Yang (+15)

Third round
Saturday, April 11, 2015

Jordan Spieth established a new Masters record for lowest 54-hole score after a round of 70 (−2) gave him a four-shot lead after the third round. His total of 200 broke by one stroke the record previously held by Raymond Floyd in 1976 and Tiger Woods in 1997. Spieth got as low as 18-under during the round, tying Woods for lowest score in relation to par in tournament history, before a double bogey at the 17th. Justin Rose birdied five holes on the back nine, including four in a row, to equal the best round of the day with a 67 (−5) and move into second place.  Phil Mickelson also shot 67 and moved into third place.

Final round
Sunday, April 12, 2015

Summary
Jordan Spieth equaled the tournament scoring record after a round of 70 (−2) gave him a four-stroke victory over Phil Mickelson and Justin Rose and his first major championship. Beginning the round four and five shots behind, respectively, Rose and Mickelson were only able to get within three shots at any point in the round. Spieth's total of 270 tied Tiger Woods in 1997 for lowest score in Masters history, and he became the first wire-to-wire Masters champion since Raymond Floyd in 1976. He got as low as 19-under after a birdie at the 15th, the first in Masters history to do so, before missing an 8-foot par putt at the 18th that would have broken the record. For the week, he recorded 28 birdies, three more than the previous tournament record set by Mickelson in 2001.

Final leaderboard

Scorecard

References

External links

Coverage on the PGA Tour's official site
Coverage from the PGA of America

2015
2015 in golf
2015 in American sports
2015 in sports in Georgia (U.S. state)
April 2015 sports events in the United States